This list of Colorado companies includes notable companies that were created or headquartered in Colorado.

Companies based in Colorado

A
 Aimco
 Air Methods
 American Furniture Warehouse
 American Medical Response
 Antero Resources
 AppExtremes
 Arrow Electronics
 Arrowhead Mills
 Aspen Skiing Company
 Avery Brewing Company

B
 Backflip Studios
 Ball Corporation
 Boston Market
 Boulder Brands
 Breckenridge Brewery

C
 Celestial Seasonings
 Cherwell Software
 Chocolove
 City Market
 Colorado Interstate Gas
 Coors Brewing Company
 CraftWorks Restaurants & Breweries
 Crocs
 CSG International

D
 Datavail
 DaVita Inc.
 Denver Rock Island Railroad
 Digital First Media
 DigitalGlobe
 Dish Network
 Dynamic Materials Corporation

E
 eBags
 EchoStar
 Einstein Bros. Bagels
 Elope, Inc.
 Estes Industries
 Exede
 Executive Recycling
 Elevations Credit Union
 Empower Retirement

F
 FirstBank Holding Co
FreeBSD Foundation
 FreeWave Technologies
 Frontier Airlines

G
 Gaia, Inc
 Gates Corporation 
 Golden Software
 Good Times Burgers & Frozen Custard
 Gray Line Worldwide
 Great Divide Brewing Company
 Great Lakes Aircraft Company

H
 Hammond's Candies
 HomeAdvisor

I
 Ibotta

J
 JBS USA
 Jeppesen
 Johns Manville

K
 Key Lime Air
 Kidrobot
 King Soopers
 Kong Company
 Kroenke Sports & Entertainment

L
 LaMar's Donuts
 Leopold Bros.
 Level 3 Communications
 Liberty Global
 Liberty Media
 Liberty Skis
 Loaf 'N Jug
 Love Grown Foods

M
 MapQuest
 Matchstick Productions
 MDC Holdings
 Mile High Comics
 Molson Coors Brewing Company
 Museum Store Company

N
 name.com
 National CineMedia
 Navis Logistics Network
 Never Summer
 New Belgium Brewing Company
 Newmont Mining Corporation
 Noodles & Company
 Novus Biologicals

O
 Odell Brewing Company
 Osprey Packs
 OtterBox

P
 PCL Construction
 Peach Street Distillers
 Pearl Izumi
 PostNet
 PopSockets

Q
 Quark
 Quiznos

R
 RE/MAX
 Recondo Technology
 Red Robin
 Rocky Mountain Chocolate Factory

S
 Saga Petroleum LLC
 SBR Creative Media
 SCI Fidelity Records
 Smashburger
 Software Bisque
 SparkFun Electronics
 SpotX
 Spyder
 Spyderco
 Stranahan's Colorado Whiskey
 System76

T
 Thanasi Foods
 TransMontaigne

V
 Vail Resorts
 Ventria Bioscience
 Verio
 VF Corporation

W
 Water Pik, Inc.
 Webroot
 Western Sugar Cooperative
 Western Union
 WhiteWave Foods
 Wing-Time
 Wolf Robotics
 Woody's Chicago Style
 Worker Studio

X
 Xero Shoes

Y 

 Young Americans Bank

Z
 Zynex

Companies formerly based in Colorado

A
 Aerocar 2000

B
 Big O Tires
 Budget Truck Rental

C
 Chipotle Mexican Grill
 Ciber
 Corporate Express
 Cox Models

D
 Dex Media
 Discovery Holding Company

E
 Envision Healthcare

F
 Flying Dog Brewery

J
 Janus Capital Group
 Jolly Rancher

L
 Lärabar
 Level 3 Communications

M
 Magpul Industries
 MapQuest
 Mushkin

N
 NextMedia Group

P
 Paladin Press

Q
 Qdoba Mexican Grill

R
 Range Fuels

S
 Samsonite
 Sports Authority

T
 Terra Soft Solutions

V
 Village Inn

References

companies
Colorado